Established in 1999, Mere Mortals was a British video game developer based in Newcastle upon Tyne. It announced its withdrawal from games in 2010 and confirmed that decision the next year, intending to work with internet, television and film.

In addition to its games, Mere Mortals contributed to three films by Danny Boyle: Sunshine, 28 Weeks Later and Slumdog Millionaire.

Games

References

British companies established in 1999
Video game development companies
Defunct video game companies of the United Kingdom
Video game companies established in 1999
Companies based in Newcastle upon Tyne
1999 establishments in England
Privately held companies of England